Jesús Jiménez (born 4 June 1984) is a Mexican former professional boxer who competed from 2000 to 2017, challenging for the WBA flyweight title in 2011.

Professional career

On 29 January 2011 Jiménez lost to Javier Polanco for the WBA flyweight title.

References

External links

Boxers from Jalisco
Sportspeople from Guadalajara, Jalisco
Flyweight boxers
1984 births
Living people
Mexican male boxers